Ollie Genoa Matson II (May 1, 1930 – February 19, 2011) was an American Olympic medal winning sprinter and professional football player. He played as a running back in the National Football League (NFL) from 1952 to 1966. Drafted into the NFL by the Chicago Cardinals, Matson was traded to the Los Angeles Rams for nine players following the 1958 season.

Matson was named to the Pro Bowl six times during the course of his career and was elected to the Pro Football Hall of Fame in 1972.

College career

Ollie Matson graduated from George Washington High School in San Francisco in 1948.

Matson attended the City College of San Francisco prior to transferring to the University of San Francisco.  While in school, Matson became a member of Kappa Alpha Psi fraternity.  In 1951, Matson's senior year at USF, he led the nation in rushing yardage and touchdowns en route to leading the Dons to an undefeated season.  He was selected as an All-American and finished ninth in Heisman Trophy balloting that year.

Despite its 9–0 record, the 1951 San Francisco team was not invited to a bowl game. It was later reported that the Orange, Sugar and Gator Bowls—all hosted in the Deep South—did not consider inviting any teams that had African American players, and USF refused to play without its two African-American members.

Matson was inducted into the College Football Hall of Fame in 1976.

Olympic Games

Prior to joining the National Football League in 1952, Matson competed in track and field as part of the United States Olympic Team in the 1952 Summer Olympics at Helsinki, Finland. Matson won a bronze medal in the 400-meter run and a silver medal as part of the United States 4x400-meter relay team.

NFL career

Ollie Matson was drafted in the first round of the 1952 NFL draft by the Chicago Cardinals, third pick overall. He went on to share 1952 Rookie of the Year honors with Hugh McElhenny of the San Francisco 49ers.

Matson missed the entire 1953 season while serving in the United States Army. During his year of service, he was named the MVP of the All-Army football team.

During the 1957 season, Matson was used extensively as a wide receiver by Chicago Cardinals head coach Ray Richards. Matson's productivity at the position was questioned in the wake of the team's 3 win, 9 loss finish, with some observers arguing that Matson's effectiveness as a running back was diminished by such use. New Cardinals head coach for 1958 Frank "Pop" Ivy took strong exception to such criticism of Matson lining up as a wide out, declaring:

"I have heard people say that the Cards stuck Matson out there on the flank as a 'decoy' on pass plays, and then forgot about him. That is absurd. He was sent out as flanker with the idea of throwing to him. But most opponents feared him so much that they doubled up on him. They watched him just as closely when he lines up as running back. They'd double team him if he were sitting up in the grandstand eating hot dogs, just to make sure."

Matson finished the aforementioned 1957 campaign as the NFL's sixth most prolific running back, with 577 yards gained in 134 carries, for a 4.3 yard average, with 6 touchdowns. To this he added 20 catches for 451 yards and 3 touchdowns through the air.

Following the 1958 season, Matson was traded by the Cardinals to the league's marquee franchise, the Los Angeles Rams, for nine players. Matson would later play for the Detroit Lions and the Philadelphia Eagles, earning Pro Bowl honors six times in his career (1952 and 1954–1958).

When Matson retired in 1966, his 12,799 career all-purpose yards were second only to Jim Brown.

Matson was inducted to the Pro Football Hall of Fame in 1972.

Personal life

He married his wife Mary, whom he met when both were San Francisco teenagers in the mid-1940s, in 1952.  He and Mary lived in the same Los Angeles home from the time he played for the Los Angeles Rams until his death.

In his later years Matson had dementia (he had been mostly bedridden for several years), which was linked to Chronic traumatic encephalopathy (CTE), a progressive degenerative disease, diagnosed post-mortem in individuals with a history of multiple concussions and other forms of head injury. According to his son, Ollie Matson, Jr., due to his degenerative brain disease Matson would wash the family's four cars almost daily and barbecue chicken at 6:30 am during his later years.

According to his nephew, Matson hadn't spoken in the four years prior to his passing.

Death

On February 19, 2011, Ollie Matson died of dementia complications (respiratory failure) surrounded by family at his home in Los Angeles, California.

See also

 List of college football yearly rushing leaders
 List of NCAA major college football yearly scoring leaders

Footnotes

Bibliography

John Eisenberg, That First Season:: How Vince Lombardi Took the Worst Team in the NFL and Set It on the Path to Glory. New York: Houghton Mifflin Harcourt Publishing Co., 2009.

External links
 
 
 

1930 births
2011 deaths
American football return specialists
American football fullbacks
American football halfbacks
American football players with chronic traumatic encephalopathy
American male sprinters
Athletes (track and field) at the 1952 Summer Olympics
Chicago Cardinals players
College Football Hall of Fame inductees
Detroit Lions players
Eastern Conference Pro Bowl players
Los Angeles Rams players
Olympic bronze medalists for the United States in track and field
Olympic silver medalists for the United States in track and field
Philadelphia Eagles players
Pro Football Hall of Fame inductees
San Francisco Dons football players
African-American players of American football
People from Trinity, Texas
Players of American football from San Francisco
Medalists at the 1952 Summer Olympics
Track and field athletes from San Francisco
Track and field athletes in the National Football League
20th-century African-American sportspeople
21st-century African-American people